Hasrat is a Syrian town located in Abu Kamal District, Deir ez-Zor.  According to the Syria Central Bureau of Statistics (CBS), Hasrat had a population of 6,306 in the 2004 census.

References 

Populated places in Deir ez-Zor Governorate
Populated places on the Euphrates River